Zubayer Rahman Chowdhury (born 18 May 1961) is a Bangladeshi justice of the High Court Division Supreme Court of Bangladesh. He was appointed in 2003.

Early life 
Chowdhury was born on 18 May 1961. Hs father was Justice A. F. M. Abdur Rahman Chowdhury. He completed his bachelors and masters in law from the University of Dhaka.

Career 
Chowdhury started working as a lawyer on 3 March 1985. He was elevated to a  lawyer of the High Court Division on 17 May 1987.

On 27 August 2003, Chowdhury was appointed an additional judge of the High Court Division by the Bangladesh Nationalist Party government. His appointment to the High Court Division became permanent on 27 August 2005.

On 28 July 2008, Chowdhury and 18 other judges opposed a High Court Division verdict that called for judges whose appointment was not confirmed by the Bangladesh Nationalist Party to be confirmed.

On 7 January 2010, Chowdhury and Justice Sashanka Shekhar Sarkar issued an order stating it was illegal for the government to make a civil servant an  officer on special duty for more than 150 days illegal.

On 10 January 2021, Chowdhury and Justice Kazi Zinat Hoque issued a order which stated that women cannot become marriage registrars.

References

External links 
 Judges' List: High Court Division

1961 births
Living people
Supreme Court of Bangladesh justices
University of Dhaka alumni
20th-century Bangladeshi lawyers
21st-century Bangladeshi lawyers
21st-century judges